Goito was a torpedo cruiser built for the Italian Regia Marina (Royal Navy) in the 1880s. Goito was built by the Regio Cantiere di Castellammare di Stabia shipyard between September 1885 and February 1888. The ship served the duration of her career in the main Italian fleet. Her early service was primarily occupied with training exercises; front-line duties ended in 1897 when she was converted into a minelayer, though she continued to participate in fleet exercises. During World War I, Goito laid defensive minefields in the Adriatic Sea. She was eventually sold for scrap in 1920 and broken up.

Design

She displaced  normally. Her propulsion system consisted of three double-expansion steam engines each driving a single screw propeller, with steam supplied by six coal-fired locomotive boilers. She had a crew of between 105 and 121.

The primary armament for Goito was five  torpedo tubes. She carried a light gun battery for defense against torpedo boats. This consisted of five  40-caliber guns, two  20-cal. guns, and three 37 mm revolving Hotchkiss guns, all mounted singly.

Service history
Goito was built by the Regio Cantiere di Castellammare di Stabia shipyard; her keel was laid down in September 1885 and her completed hull was launched on 6 July 1887. She was completed on 16 February 1888 and commissioned into the fleet, the first member of her class to enter service. The maneuvers consisted of close-order drills and a simulated attack on and defense of La Spezia. Later that year, the ship was present during a naval review held for the German Kaiser Wilhelm II during a visit to Italy.

During the maneuvers, which lasted from 6 August to 5 September, the ships of the Active Squadron simulated a French attack on the Italian fleet. The following year, the ship took part in the annual fleet maneuvers in the 1st Division of the Active Squadron, along with the ironclad battleship  and the protected cruiser . That year, Goito had her coal-fired boilers replaced with oil-fired models, and her center engine and propeller shaft were removed.

In 1895, Goito was stationed in the 2nd Maritime Department, split between Taranto and  Naples, along with most of the torpedo cruisers in the Italian fleet. Goito was converted into a minelayer in 1897. Her torpedo tubes were removed and equipment to handle sixty naval mines was installed. During the 1907 fleet maneuvers, Goito was attached to the main fleet to lay mines at a simulated advance base that would be created during the exercises.

At the outbreak of the Italo-Turkish War in September 1911, Goito was stationed in Venice along with Tripoli and Montebello. None of the vessels saw action during the war. Italy had declared neutrality at the start of World War I, but by July 1915, the Triple Entente had convinced the Italians to enter the war against the Central Powers. Admiral Paolo Thaon di Revel, the Italian naval chief of staff, believed that the threat from Austro-Hungarian submarines and naval mines in the narrow waters of the Adriatic was too serious for him to use the fleet in an active way. Instead, Revel decided to implement a blockade at the relatively safer southern end of the Adriatic with the main fleet, while smaller vessels, such as the MAS boats, conducted raids on Austro-Hungarian ships and installations. The ship remained in service until early 1920; she was stricken from the naval register on 15 March 1920 and subsequently broken up for scrap.

Notes

References

External links
 Classe Goito Marina Militare website 

Goito-class cruisers
1887 ships
Ships built in Castellammare di Stabia